Simon Fischer may refer to:

Simon Fischer (ice hockey) (born 1988), American-born ice hockey player 
Simon Fischer (musician), Australian violinist 
Simon Fischer nut butters manufactured by Solo Foods
Simon Fischer, fictional character introduced in Season 3 of the television series Covert Affairs

See also
Simon Fisher (disambiguation)